List of all managers of Ukrainian football club Dynamo Kyiv.

Managers 
 Figures correct as of __. Includes all competitive matches
* Player-manager+ Caretaker manager
M = Matches played; W = Matches won; D = Matches drawn; L = Matches lost; F = Goals for; A = Goals against

References

External links
 List of all coaches of Dynamo Kyiv Accessed on July 6, 2006.
 List of all Dynamo coaches + main titles - Dynamo Kyiv Official website

 
managers